Bob Burton (born Robert Russell Burton Jr.; February 21, 1985) is an American speedcuber, most famous for competing in and organizing competitions all over the world and his former world records on the Rubik's Magic and Rubik's Master Magic.

Personal life
Bob Burton grew up in Kearny, New Jersey. He graduated from Kearny High School in 2003. He studied mathematics at Rutgers University in New Brunswick, New Jersey and graduated in May 2007.  He rowed for the Rutgers Lightweight Crew team and was the president and founder of the Rutgers University Rubik's Cube Club. On March 14, 2015, Bob married Jaclyn Sawler in the Beyond Rubik's Cube exhibit at Liberty Science Center. He currently teaches high school mathematics in New York City.

Rubik's Cube

3×3×3 Cube Speedsolving
Burton began speedsolving with the 3×3×3 Rubik's Cube in May 2001.  He was first challenged by some of his friends in an informal competition to see who could solve one side the fastest and was consistently the last to finish, so he bought a Rubik's Cube and began to practice with it.  He was able to solve the cube in under a minute within a few months using a simple layer by layer method.  He competed in the 2003 Rubik's World Games Championships.

Rubik's Magic
Burton was one of the pioneers of solving the Rubik's Magic in the United States.  After learning how to solve the puzzle, he insisted on it being an official event in competitions. Ian Winokur allowed a Rubik's Magic competition at the Horace Mann Spring 2005 tournament, in which Burton broke the American record for single solve (1.56 seconds) and average of five (1.85 seconds). In his next competition, Burton also insisted on allowing the Rubik's Master Magic to be an event.  Tyson Mao agreed, so in the Caltech Summer 2005 tournament, Burton set the single solve world record for the Rubik's Magic (1.28 seconds) and the single solve (3.05 seconds) and average of five (3.54 seconds) world records for the Rubik's Master Magic.  At the Trumbull Spring 2006 tournament, Burton also broke the world record for Rubik's Magic average (1.40 seconds). He was the national champion in 2006 for the Rubik's Magic and the Rubik's Master Magic.

Rubik's Clock
At the 2005 Dutch Open Championship, Burton set the American record for the Rubik's Clock for single solve (24.12 seconds) and mean (32.68 seconds).

Other puzzles
Burton was the national champion at the 2006 US National Championships in San Francisco for the Square-1. He is also credited with creating a method for the Pyraminx, known as the “Bob Burton Method.”

One-handed cubing
Burton also practices the art of one-handed cubing, in which the competitor can use only one hand to solve the cube.  He was among the best in the world, placing 5th overall (of 61) in the first round of the 2005 Rubik's Cube World Championship.  Since then, he has dropped in the rankings, but competes in the one-handed contest nonetheless.

Blindfolded cubing
In May 2006, Burton successfully solved the Rubik's Cube blindfolded in an official competition at the Trumbull Spring 2006 tournament in a time of 6 minutes 21.87 seconds.  He had failed his first ten attempts before that, dating back to May of the previous year.  Burton uses the Pochmann system to solve a cube blindfolded, which solves one piece at a time.

Official competition times
Burton's best official solves:

References

 Rutgers Rubik's Cube whiz competes
 Cube Crazy

External links
 Burton's Speedcubing Website
 Burton's official results
 Interview with Burton

1985 births
American speedcubers
Living people
People from Newark, New Jersey
Rutgers University alumni